Lisgar 
was a federal electoral district in Manitoba, Canada, that was represented in the House of Commons of Canada from 1871 to 1988. This riding was created following the admission of Manitoba into the Canadian Confederation in 1870.

It was abolished in 1987 when it was redistributed into Brandon—Souris, Lisgar—Marquette and Provencher ridings.

Election results

By-election: As a result of Manitoba joining Confederation, 15 July 1870

By-election: On Mr. Richardson's election being declared void, 20 July 1901

By-election: On Mr. Muir's death, 26 August 1970

See also 

 List of Canadian federal electoral districts
 Past Canadian electoral districts

External links 

Former federal electoral districts of Manitoba